WMPX (1490 AM) is a radio station licensed to Midland, Michigan broadcasting a country gold format. The station is imaged as "107.7 The Highway," with 107.7 being the frequency of translator W299CK Midland. Until January 2014, the station featured the America's Best Music format distributed by Westwood One.

Until March 1, 2019, WMPX was simulcast with WMRX-FM 97.7 24/7 except for some local sports play-by-play. Although there are other radio stations licensed to Midland, WMPX is today the only commercial radio station that primarily serves the Midland area (WUGN-FM is a non-commercial religious station and WKQZ-FM is licensed to Midland but has studios in Saginaw).

History
WMPX began broadcasting in 1948 as WMDN. WMDN was Midland's first radio station, owned by the city's newspaper, the Midland Daily News. That station continued to use that callsign until July 1971.

On March 1, 2019, WMPX split from its simulcast with WMRX-FM and launched a classic country format, branded as "107.7 The Highway" (simulcast on FM translator W299CK 107.7 FM Midland).

References

Sources
Michiguide.com - WMPX History

External links

MPX (AM)
Classic country radio stations in the United States
Radio stations established in 1948